The Federalists ran a mixed ticket consisting of 2 Federalists (Aaron Ogden and John Beatty) and 4 Democratic-Republicans (William Helms, Ebenezer Elmer, George Maxwell, and Adam Boyd), one of whom (William Helms) was also on the Democratic-Republican ticket.  The Federalists capitalized on resentment over the replacement on the official Democratic-Republican ticket of Ebenezer Elmer, from South Jersey, with Thomas Newbold from Monmouth County and the retention of James Sloan.  This ticket was formed too late to gain sufficient support, but the Federalists did do much better in state elections that year than they had in previous elections.

See also 
 United States House of Representatives elections, 1806 and 1807
 List of United States representatives from New Jersey

Notes

References 

1806
New Jersey
United States House of Representatives